Gaby's Xtraordinary Files is a Philippine educational television series on ABS-CBN hosted by Gaby Dela Merced. The series premiered on March 23, 2008, and ended on June 8, 2008, replacing Ka-Pete Na! Totally Outrageous Behavior and replaced by Bakbakan, and airs on Sunday mornings.

See also
 List of programs broadcast by ABS-CBN

References

External links
 Gaby's Xtraordinary Files at Telebisyon.net

ABS-CBN original programming
2008 Philippine television series debuts
2008 Philippine television series endings
Filipino-language television shows